Operation Sultan 10 was an operation of the Islamic Republic of Iran Air Force (IRIAF) on 29 October 1980, the beginning of the Iran–Iraq War. In this operation six F-4E Phantom IIs from IRIAF's 32nd and 33rd Squadrons took part in an attack on the Al-Hurriah Airbase near Mosul in Saddam Hussein's Iraq.

Motivation
In the last days of October 1980, commanders of the 1st Tactical Air Base (TAB 1) of Iran in Tehran received intelligence that French engineers had been sent to Iraq and numbers of Mirage F1s which the Iraqi Air Force had bought from France held at Al-Hurriah Airbase near Mosul. This personnel of the French Air Force were appointed to train Iraqi pilots and technicians to use Mirage F1s.

Operation
The operation was called Sultan-10, meaning only 10 fighters were supposed to cross the borders (Sultan 1 to 10). The target was 180 miles inside Iraq at Mosul.
Eight Phantom (code-named Sultan-1 to 6) (2 as reserve), 3 Tomcat (Sultan-7 and 8) (1 as reserve) and 3 Boeing 707 tankers (Sultan-9 and 10) (1 as reserve) were planned for the operation. Both Tomcat fighters should have been beside tankers to protect them, because loss of tankers would cost the loss of all 6 Phantoms. If the operational team crossed the Iran's border right to Mosul they would engage with Air Defence bases which were supplied with SA-2, SA-3, and SA-6. Commanders ordered radio silence and start the operation before dawn. Just before getting into Iraq borders they refueled and used Turkish air space to enter Iraq. Tankers and Tomcats stayed at low altitude and waited for the Phantoms return.

While protecting the tankers, one of Tomcat's radars was always off to reduce recognition possibilities by Iraq.

Meanwhile, the attack team bombed Mosul and was on their way to Iran. Because of using max capacity of air-to-surface missiles, none of the Phantoms had air-to-air missiles.

By advantage of AN/AWG-9, the Tomcats noticed that 4 fighters were headed toward the Phantoms at 40 miles. As the Phantoms did not have any missiles to protect themselves, Sultan-7 (Captain Sedqi) and Sultan-8 (Captain Tayebi) were ordered to protect them. They headed toward them and raised their altitude to 15,000 ft. But they did not notice the existence of Tomcats, so they raised to 20,000 ft and again to 22,000 ft.

Sultan-7 missiles: 2 AIM-54, 2 AIM-9, 3 AIM-7

Sultan-8 missiles: 2 AIM-9, 6 AIM-7

At 45 miles from those 4 fighters the Tomcats recognized there were 4 Mig-23s. Sultan-7 ordered both Tomcats to turn their ECCM on. But after a while his own system failed and Sultan-8 ECCM had to cover both aircraft. At 20 miles from four Mig-23, Captain Sedqi told his co-pilot to prepare two AIM-54 Phoenix missiles. The first missile launched, followed 8 seconds later by the second. The first missile destroyed aircraft at the same time of hit. The second one seemed to not hit it, but co-pilot said it paralyzed the plane and Sultan-8 confirmed it along this report that the warhead exploded either earlier or later that it is supposed to. Iraqi fighters now noticed the danger and reduced their altitude which Iranian pilots said was the mistake that made their work easier. In only 7 miles to the Mig-23s, it supposed to Sultan-7 and 8 launch their missiles together, but it revealed the CSD system of Sultan-8 was not working, which meant he could not use its missiles and only could use the M61 Vulcan. Captain Sedqi (Sultan-7) told Sultan-8 to stay close to Sultan-9 and Sultan-10 and wait until he came back. Sedqi turned the afterburner on and the two Mig-23s split up with the leader going right and the follower going left. Sedqi chased the leader and released first AIM-7 which hit the tail and seconds later a wing detached and it leaped toward the ground. Then the co-pilot noticed that the other Mig-23 is approaching from behind. Sedqi shut the afterburner off and by performing a maneuver, reduced the speed from 520 miles to 150 miles and took the nose cone down, toward the Mig-23 that was now passing below and shot the second AIM-7 which hit the tail, sending the Mig-23 down, but its pilot ejected and it was the only pilot who survived. One of the killed pilots was Ahmad Sabah, who took down 2 Northrop F-5 of IRIAF in the early days of war.

References

Military operations of the Iran–Iraq War in 1980
Airstrikes during the Iran–Iraq War
Airstrikes conducted by Iran
Cross-border operations into Iraq
1980 in aviation
1980 in Turkey
Airstrikes in Iraq